The viceregal consort of Australia generally assists the governor-general in welcoming ambassadors and their spouses, and in performing their other official duties. The governor-general's spouse traditionally participates in celebratory occasions, attends functions and, as a patron of various voluntary associations, works to promote the activities of those associations. None of the activities have any official status. The current spouse (since 1 July 2019) is Linda Hurley, wife of David Hurley.

Both the governor-general and their spouse are entitled to the style "His/Her Excellency" during the governor-general's term of office, but not thereafter. The governor-general is entitled to the style "The Honourable" for life; this does not extend to the spouse.

Except for Dame Quentin Bryce, all Australian governors-general have been male, and all spouses but her husband Michael Bryce have been female.

No governor-general has been single throughout their term, but two spouses died during the governor-general's term: Jacqueline Sidney, Viscountess De L'Isle, wife of William Sidney, 1st Viscount De L'Isle (1962); and Alison, Lady Kerr, wife of Sir John Kerr (1974). Kerr remarried during his term; De L'Isle remarried after his term had finished.

The longest-serving spouse has been Zara Hore-Ruthven, Countess of Gowrie, wife of the longest-serving governor-general, Alexander Hore-Ruthven, 1st Earl of Gowrie, who served nine years from 1936 to 1945. The shortest-serving spouse was Alison Morrison, Viscountess Dunrossil, wife of William Morrison, 1st Viscount Dunrossil, who died in 1961, one year and one day after taking up the office, being the only governor-general to die in office; Viscountess Dunrossil died in 1983.

Most of the spouses of governors-general have been content to be background figures providing the office-holder with support. Some have been all but unknown to the general Australian public. However, some have been notable in their own right, and details are shown in the following table.

List of viceregal consorts of Australia

See also
 King consort
 Queen consort
 Spouse of the prime minister of Australia

References

 
 
Australia